Sudu Hansi is a 2010 Sri Lankan Sinhala adult drama film directed by Mohamad Shaffraz and co-produced by Sisira Hewahenna and Chandrika Godakanda for Nimana Films. It stars Arjuna Kamalanath, Amisha Kavindi and Semini Iddamalgoda in lead roles along with Muthu Tharanga and Sarath Chandrasiri. Music composed by Navaratne Gamage. It is the 1133rd Sri Lankan film in the Sinhala cinema.

Plot

Cast
 Arjuna Kamalanath as Anjana / Clifford
 Amisha Kavindi as Maleesha
 Semini Iddamalgoda as Shami Ransiri
 Neil Alles as Ransiri 'Rane'
 Sarath Chandrasiri as Shami's guard
 Muthu Tharanga as Wathsala

References

2010 films
2010s Sinhala-language films
2010 drama films
Sri Lankan drama films